The following ships of the Indian Navy have been named INS Vidyut:

  was the lead vessel of her class of fast attack craft of the Indian Navy which served in the Indo-Pakistani War of 1971

Indian Navy ship names